The 2002–03 Iowa State Cyclones men's basketball team represents Iowa State University during the 2002–03 NCAA Division I men's basketball season. The Cyclones were coached by Larry Eustachy, who was in his fifth (and final) season. They played their home games at Hilton Coliseum in Ames, Iowa and competed in the Big 12 Conference.

Previous season

The Cyclones finished 12-19, 4-12 in Big 12 play to finish 11th the regular season conference standings.

Incoming players

Roster

Schedule and results

|-
!colspan=12 style=""|Exhibition

|-

|-
!colspan=12 style=""|Regular Season

|-

|-

|-

|-

|-

|-

|-

|-

|-

|-

|-

|-

|-

|-

|-

|-

|-

|-

|-

|-

|-

|-

|-

|-

|-

|-

|-
!colspan=12 style=""|Big 12 Tournament
|-

|-

|-
!colspan=12 style=""|NIT Tournament
|-

|-

|-

Awards and honors

All-Conference Selections

Jake Sullivan (3rd Team)
Jackson Vroman (Honorable Mention)

Academic All-American
Jake Sullivan (2003)

Academic All-Big 12 First Team

Jake Sullivan (2003)
Jared Homan (2003)

Ralph A. Olsen Award

Jake Sullivan (2003)

References

Iowa State Cyclones men's basketball seasons
Iowa State
Iowa State
Iowa State Cyc
Iowa State Cyc